Francisco José Andrés Romero (born 28 October 1987), known as Pulpo Romero or simply Pulpo, is a Spanish footballer who plays for Othellos Athienou as a goalkeeper.

Club career
Born in Albacete, Castile-La Mancha, Pulpo was an Albacete Balompié youth graduate. He made his senior debuts with Atlético Tarazona in 2006, in Tercera División.

On 17 August 2008 Pulpo first arrived in Segunda División B, after joining Real Murcia Imperial. On 18 July 2010 he moved to CD Leganés, also in the third division.

Pulpo acted as a backup to Rubén Falcón during his first and only season at the Madrid side. On 16 July 2011 he signed for fellow league team Orihuela CF, again featuring sparingly.

In August 2012 Pulpo moved abroad for the first time in his career, joining Cypriot First Division side Doxa Katokopias F.C. Late in the month he was loaned to fellow league team AEK Larnaca F.C., with Alexandre Negri moving in the opposite direction.

On 5 June 2013 Pulpo signed a one-year deal with AEL Limassol.

Pulpo joined Othellos Athienou on 1 January 2019.

References

External links

1987 births
Living people
Sportspeople from Albacete
Spanish footballers
Footballers from Castilla–La Mancha
Association football goalkeepers
Segunda División B players
Tercera División players
RCD Mallorca B players
Orihuela CF players
CD Leganés players
Cypriot First Division players
Cypriot Second Division players
Doxa Katokopias FC players
AEK Larnaca FC players
AEL Limassol players
Liga II players
FC Rapid București players
Enosis Neon Paralimni FC players
Othellos Athienou F.C. players
Spanish expatriate footballers
Spanish expatriate sportspeople in Cyprus
Expatriate footballers in Cyprus
Expatriate footballers in Romania
Atlético Astorga FC players
La Roda CF players